Maurice Herbert Evans (3 June 1901 – 12 March 1989) was an English actor, noted for his interpretations of Shakespearean characters. His best-known screen roles include Dr. Zaius in the 1968 film Planet of the Apes and Samantha Stephens's father, Maurice, on Bewitched.

Early years
Evans was born at 28 Icen Way in Dorchester, Dorset. He was the son of Laura (Turner) and Alfred Herbert Evans, a Welsh dispensing chemist and keen amateur actor who made adaptations of novels by Thomas Hardy for the local amateur company. Young Maurice made his first stage appearance as a small boy in Far from the Madding Crowd.

He first appeared on the stage in 1926 at the Cambridge Festival Theatre and joined the Old Vic Company in 1934, playing Hamlet, Richard II, and Iago. He was selected by Terence Gray to appear in the opening production in November 1926 at the Festival Theatre, taking the part of Orestes in two parts of the sensational production of the Oresteia of Aeschylus. This was followed by Lord Belvoir in The Man Who Ate the Popomack by W. J. Turner, and Saint Anthony in Maeterlinck's The Miracle of Saint Anthony.

In 1927, Evans played a poet in The Pleasure Garden by Beatrice Mayor followed by Young Man in On Baile's Strand by W. B. Yeats, Midir in The Immortal Hour by Fiona Macleod, the Hon. Algernon Moodie in The Rumour by C.K. Munro, Mark Ingestire in Sweeney Todd by Dibdin Pitt, the poet in The Lost Silk Hat by Lord Dunsany, the Captain in Androcles and the Lion by George Bernard Shaw, Mister Four and Young Man in The Adding Machine by Elmer Rice, Don Juan in the play of the same title by James Elroy Flecker, two parts in Terence Gray's own play The Red Nights of the Tcheka, the Stage Manager in The Player Queen (also by Yeats), the Second Engineer in The Insect Play by the Čapek brothers, Prince Kamose in another Gray play called And in the Tomb, and finally in June 1927, Don Pelegari in Pirandello's Each In His Own Way. Both Yeats and Shaw attended performances of their own plays.

Career
In 1927, he was one of a group of out-of-work actors including Laurence Olivier, chosen to perform in a "tryout" of R. C. Sherriff's Journey's End directed by James Whale at the Apollo Theatre in London, and later in 1929 at the Savoy Theatre which had been leased by the Chicago theatre manager Maurice Browne. It was a huge success, running for two years and making Maurice's name. He played the young officer Raleigh, who dies at the end of the play. In 1934, he went to the Old Vic Theatre where his interpretation of Shakespeare's Richard II was highly praised. It was as a result of this that he was invited to join Katharine Cornell in the United States. His first appearance on Broadway was in Romeo and Juliet opposite Katharine Cornell in 1936, but he made his biggest impact in Shakespeare's Richard II, a production whose unexpected success was the surprise of the 1937 theatre season and allowed Evans to play Hamlet (1938) (the first time that the play was performed uncut on the New York stage), Falstaff in Henry IV, Part 1 (1939), Macbeth (1941) and Malvolio in Twelfth Night (1942) opposite the Viola of Helen Hayes, under the direction of Margaret Webster. He also starred opposite Cornell in the 1935 production of George Bernard Shaw's St. Joan.

When the U.S. entered the Second World War, he enlisted in the United States Army and he later was in charge of an Army Entertainment Section in the Central Pacific. He arranged for the transfer of Carl Reiner from the Signal Corps to the entertainment unit in Hawaii, where Major Evans was his commanding officer. The unit produced dozens of shows for the troops in the Pacific. Reiner later hired Evans for the part of Hobart the butler in The Jerk, as Evans's agent had indicated that the part would enable Evans to maintain his union benefits.  

Evans produced his famous "G.I. version" of Hamlet that cut the text of the play to make the title character more appealing to the troops, an interpretation so popular that he later took it to Broadway in 1945. Evans rose to the rank of Major by the end of the war. He shifted his attention to the works of Shaw, notably as John Tanner in Man and Superman and as King Magnus in The Apple Cart. In 1952, he starred as the murderous husband in the original Broadway stage production of Dial M for Murder. He also successfully produced Broadway productions in which he did not appear, notably The Teahouse of the August Moon.

In 1956, Evans recorded an LP of stories from Winnie-the-Pooh. American television audiences of the 1960s will remember Evans as Samantha's father, Maurice, on the sitcom Bewitched. His real-life insistence that his first name be pronounced "Morris" was ironically at odds with his Bewitched character's contrasting stance that it be pronounced "Maw-REESE". Evans also appeared in the fourth season of Daniel Boone starring Fess Parker playing a French impresario "Beaumarchais." He also played The Puzzler on Batman in a double episode storyline (which was common for that series) in December 1966. Continuing his American TV appearances, he guest starred in The Big Valley from the latter part of the fourth and final season of that western series in April 1969, an episode entitled "Danger Road."

Evans had great impact on the big screen as well. He played a diabolical villain in Kind Lady (1951; co-starring Ethel Barrymore, Keenan Wynn, and Angela Lansbury); Emperor Antoninus in Androcles and the Lion (1952); and Sir Arthur Sullivan in The Story of Gilbert and Sullivan (1953). Evans appeared memorably in two 1968 films: as the evolved orangutan, Dr. Zaius in Planet of the Apes (and the 1970 sequel Beneath the Planet of the Apes) and as the doomed "Hutch", who attempts to warn his friend, the title character, Rosemary Woodhouse, in the thriller Rosemary's Baby, of the true Satanic nature of her neighbours, Roman and Minnie Castavet (played by Sidney Blackmer and Ruth Gordon).

Evans appeared in more American television productions of Shakespeare than any other actor. Beginning in 1953, for the famous television anthology, Hallmark Hall of Fame, he starred in the first feature-length (i.e., longer than an hour) dramatisations of the plays to be presented on American television. They were:
 Hamlet
 Macbeth twice – both times appearing with Dame Judith Anderson who won an Emmy for both of her television performances as Lady Macbeth. Evans won an Emmy Award for the latter, 1960 production. The earlier, a live telecast, was in 1954)
 Richard II
 Twelfth Night (as Malvolio)
 The Taming of the Shrew (as Petruchio, opposite Lilli Palmer as Katherine)
 The Tempest (as Prospero)

In bringing so much Shakespeare to American television in such a short span of time (between 1953 and 1960), Evans was a true pioneer. This had never been tried before – at least, not in the U.S. He firmly believed that it was an actor's job to "lead public taste, not to play to public taste".

Evans brought his Shakespeare productions to Broadway many times, playing Hamlet on the Great White Way in four separate productions for a record grand total of 283 performances. He and Dame Judith Anderson starred on Broadway several times in Macbeth. Their performances were widely regarded as the definitive portrayals of these characters, although one notable dissenter was Orson Welles, who stated that Evans, as an actor, was "worse than bad – he was poor."

Evans appeared on Broadway as Hamlet four times, but the productions of the play that he appeared in were consecutive revivals of it – no other actor played Hamlet on Broadway between 1938, when Evans first played him there, and 1946, which marked Evans's last Broadway Hamlet. He is very likely the only actor to have accomplished this, so far.

Personal life
Although he had taken U.S. citizenship in 1941, Evans had returned to Britain by the end of the 1960s. Aside from an infrequent trip to the United States and occasional visits to retired actors in financial need (as a representative of the Actors' Fund, of which he was a longtime trustee), he lived quietly near Brighton. He never married, and was survived by a brother, Hugh, of London.

Publication
All This and Evans Too, memoir, University of South Carolina Press, 1987;

Death
Evans died, aged 87, in Rottingdean, East Sussex, England, reportedly of heart failure as a result of a bronchial infection.

Partial filmography

 White Cargo (1929) – Langford
 Raise the Roof (1930) – Rodney Langford
 Should a Doctor Tell? (1930) – Roger Smith
 Wedding Rehearsal (1932) – George Thompson aka Tootles
 Marry Me (1932) – Paul Hart
 The Path of Glory (1934) – Anton Maroni
 The Only Girl (1934) – Didier
 Bypass to Happiness (1934) – Robin
 Checkmate (1935) – Phillip Allen
 Scrooge (1935) – Poor man
 Kind Lady (1951) – Henry Springer Elcott
 Androcles and the Lion (1952) – Emperor Antoninus (Caesar)
 The Story of Gilbert and Sullivan (1953) – Arthur Sullivan
 Bewitched (TV series, 1964–1971) – Maurice
 The War Lord (1965) – Priest
 One of Our Spies Is Missing (1966) – Sir Norman Swickert
 Batman episodes "The Puzzles are Coming" and "The Duo Is Slumming" (1966) – The Puzzler
 Traitors of San Angel (1967) – James Keefe
 Jack of Diamonds (1967) – Nicolai Vodkine
 Planet of the Apes (1968) – Dr. Zaius
 Rosemary's Baby (1968) – Hutch
 The Body Stealers (1969) – Dr. Matthews
 Operation Heartbeat (1969)
 Beneath the Planet of the Apes (1970) – Dr. Zaius
 Terror in the Wax Museum (1973) – Inspector Daniels
 Columbo: Forgotten Lady (TV series, 1975) – Raymond
 The Jerk (1979) – Hobart
 A Caribbean Mystery, Agatha Christie (1983)  - Major Geoffrey Palgrave

Selected stage credits
 Sea Fever (1931), New Theatre

References

External links

 
 Maurice Evans papers, 1934–1970, held by the Billy Rose Theatre Division, New York Public Library for the Performing Arts; accessed 7 October 2015.
  Performances in Theatre Archive University of Bristol; accessed 20 May 2018.
 
Obituary, The New York Times; accessed 7 October 2015.

1901 births
1989 deaths
Military personnel from Dorset
20th-century American male actors
20th-century English male actors
United States Army personnel of World War II
American male film actors
American male Shakespearean actors
American male stage actors
American male television actors
American people of British descent
American people of Welsh descent
British expatriate male actors in the United States
British male Shakespearean actors
English emigrants to the United States
English male film actors
English male stage actors
English male television actors
English people of Welsh descent
Outstanding Performance by a Lead Actor in a Miniseries or Movie Primetime Emmy Award winners
People from Dorchester, Dorset
People educated at Hackney Downs School
People with acquired American citizenship
Special Tony Award recipients
United States Army officers
American people of English descent